Senator Morrow may refer to:

Members of the United States Senate
Dwight Morrow (1873–1931), U.S. Senator from New Jersey from 1930 to 1931
Jeremiah Morrow (1771–1852), U.S. Senator from Ohio from 1813 to 1819

United States state senate members
Bill Morrow (California politician) (born 1954), California State Senate
Thomas Z. Morrow (1835–1913), Kentucky State Senate